The Washington and Georgetown Railroad Company (or Washington and Georgetown Railway Company) was the first streetcar company to operate in Washington, D.C., United States. It was incorporated and started operations in 1862, using horse-drawn cars on tracks between Georgetown and the Navy Yard. Two additional lines ran on 7th Street NW/SW and 14th Street NW. In 1890, it switched to cable cars. On September 21, 1895, the company was purchased by the Rock Creek Railway and the two formed the Capital Traction Company.

Origins
In 1852, side-bearing rail streetcar tracks were developed in New York City. Beginning in 1858, New York City businessmen began trying to bring streetcar service in Washington, D.C., where transit consisted of horse-drawn wagons (omnibuses) on several lines. On May 17, 1862, the United States Congress enacted legislation that incorporated the first Washington street car company. A provision in the law authorized the Washington and Georgetown Railroad Company (or Washington and Georgetown Railway Company according to some official sources) to build three street horsecar lines.

The first streetcar started running on Pennsylvania Avenue NW from the Capitol to the State Department on July 29, 1862. Full operations, from the Navy Yard to Georgetown on Pennsylvania Avenue NW/SE, began on October 2, 1862. The horsecars traveled from the intersection of High Street and Bridge Street (Now Wisconsin Ave NW and M St NW) in Georgetown along Bridge Street to Pennsylvania Avenue. 

The line then traveled along Pennsylvania Avenue and passed the White House and the foot of the Capitol Building. From there it went north on 1st St NW one block, then east on B St NW/NE for two blocks, then south across the Capitol Grounds on the east side of the Capitol and back onto Pennsylvania Avenue. It then traveled southeast on Pennsylvania to 8th St SE where it turned south to the Navy Yard, stopping at M St SE and 8th St SE.

Expansion
A second line opened on November 15, 1862. It was built along 7th Street NW from N Street NW to the Potomac River. In 1863 the 7th Street line was extended north to Boundary Street NW. It expanded south to the Arsenal (now Fort McNair) in 1875. A third line, built by 1870, ran down 14th Street NW from Boundary Street NW (now Florida Avenue) to the Treasury Building.

In 1877, the company built a car barn at 13th and Boundary Streets NW. From 1877-92, the company expanded the facility several times, adding a blacksmith shop in 1878. The omnibus company that existed prior to the introduction of streetcars was forced out of business. The Washington and Georgetown line then purchased the company's stables to be used as a car barn and, much later, as machine shops.

Switch to cable cars

On March 2, 1889, the District authorized every streetcar company in Washington to switch from horse power to underground cable or to electricity provided by battery or underground wires (overhead wires were banned). The following year, companies were authorized to sell stock to pay for the upgrades. In 1892, one-horse cars were banned within the city, and by 1894, Congress began requiring companies to switch from horse power.

Immediately after the 1889 law was passed, the Washington and Georgetown began installing an underground cable system. Their 7th Street line was switched to a cable car system on April 12, 1890. The rest of the system was in operation by August 18, 1892. 

Two cables pulled the cars up and down Pennsylvania Avenue NW/SE between the Navy Yard and Georgetown. The company built five new facilities to handle the cable car operations. In 1892, they extended their track along 14th to Mount Pleasant Street NW (now Park Road NW) and built a new barn there. They moved the cars from the barn at 13th Street and Florida Avenue NW to the new one and sold the older facility which was converted into a printing plant. 

In 1893, the company built the Navy Yard Car Barn across from the Navy Yard to service the new cars.
The company built two powerhouses to provide energy for the system, one at 14th Street NW and E Street NW and the other at 7th Street SW and P Street SW. In the middle of the intersection of 14th Street NW and Pennsylvania Avenue NW a large wheel pit was constructed. In addition the company was authorized, on August 23, 1894, to extend its line on M Street NW to the Aqueduct Bridge, and build a "Union Station" - now the Georgetown Car Barn.

The end of the line
By the mid-1890s, there were numerous streetcar companies operating in the District. Congress tried to deal with this fractured transit system by requiring them to accept transfers and set standard pricing and by allowing them to use one another's track. But eventually it became clear that consolidation was the best solution. On March 1, 1895, Congress authorized the Rock Creek Railway to purchase the Washington and Georgetown. It did so on September 21, 1895, forming the Capital Traction Company, the first company created during "the great streetcar consolidation" and spelling the end of the Washington and Georgetown Railroad Company as a separate entity.

External links 
 Lost Capitol Hill: The Washington and Georgetown Railroad Car House

Notes 

Street railways in Washington, D.C.
Georgetown (Washington, D.C.)
Defunct Washington, D.C., railroads
1862 establishments in Washington, D.C.
1895 disestablishments in Washington, D.C.